Michał Wojciechowski (born 22 February 1974) is a Polish rower. He competed in the men's quadruple sculls event at the 2000 Summer Olympics.

References

1974 births
Living people
Polish male rowers
Olympic rowers of Poland
Rowers at the 2000 Summer Olympics
Sportspeople from Poznań